Michael Huttner is an American attorney, author, crisis communications expert and political entrepreneur.  Huttner is a partner with Culture of Giving Back to advise donors on progressive causes and he also serves as Chief Executive Officer of Next Titan Capital, a boutique investment bank focused on cannabis and psychedelics. Huttner was formerly the CEO of Powerplant Global Strategies, a public affairs firm focused on investments in the cannabis industry. In January 2010, he convened a small group of drug reform and policy leaders in Colorado, which laid the groundwork for Colorado to become the first state to decriminalize cannabis in the country.  In January 2020, Huttner convened the first meeting to legalize psychedelics statewide in Colorado which culminated with the passage of the Natural Medicine Health Act in November, 2022.  Previously, Huttner served as the CEO Fenton, the largest social change agency in the US. He is the founder of ProgressNow, a network of progressive communication organizations across the United States.  To date, Huttner has helped launch over 40 different political and communication organizations.

ProgressNow 
Huttner is the Founder of ProgressNow, a network of state-based communications organizations that informs and moves people to action for progressive solutions through communications and digital media.  Mr. Huttner started ProgressNow in the back of his law firm with his personal list of 700 email addresses in 2003.  Today, the 26 ProgressNow state partners have a combined membership exceeding 3.4 million individuals.  Huttner and Bobby Clark, a former staffer to the Howard Dean presidential campaign, worked together in 2005 with the technology provider Blue State Digital to develop the website that launched as ProgressNow.  ProgressNow was later adopted by the Barack Obama presidential campaign, 2008. The Washington Post referred to their work as one of the most "ambitious" efforts in grassroots organizing at the state level. Starting with Colorado and then Ohio,  Huttner developed a network of state based communications hubs across the country.
In 2010, the book "The Blueprint: How Democrats Won Colorado, and Why Republicans Everywhere Should Care" described ProgressNow as the "crown jewel" of the progressive investors' effort to flip the state.

Author 
Huttner is the co-author of The Resistance Handbook: 48 Ways to Fight Trump.,.  He also is the author of 50 Ways  You Can Help Obama Change America., which the late Senator Edward Kennedy described as "A practical handbook on how every American can do something for our country."

50 Ways was attacked by conservative commentators including Fox News's Neil Cavuto.  Conservative author Michelle Malkin also attacked Huttner for reaching out to "[Obama] cultists" and for trying to knock her book Culture of Corruption: Obama and His Team of Tax Cheats, Crooks, and Cronies off The New York Times Best Seller list.

Reputation 
Huttner first earned his reputation to hold public officials accountable when he called on every public official in Colorado who supported Congresswoman Marilyn Musgrave's proposed Federal Marriage Amendment to sign a "fidelity pledge."

Huttner also was successful with an onslaught of accountability work against top elected officials after he put up a billboard near the Colorado State Capitol that accused Governor Bill Owens of Colorado's post-September 11 attacks economic downturn.

Huttner has been referred to as a communications 'heavyweight' and is known for his creative, hard hitting tactics and snark.  One of his best known efforts involved renting a plane to fly over Denver's Invesco Field at Mile High two days before the 2008 general election with a message "McCain is a Raiders Fan."  Huttner also gained notoriety around the 1998 Super Bowl where he went without a ticket and then paid a Coca-Cola Vendor $300 for his outfit and then snuck past security to watch the Super Bowl. In early 2022, Huttner initiated the team and strategy for Adam Frisch in his campaign to replace Lauren Boebert and is considered by many to be the biggest upset in the 2022 election cycle.

Education and professional career 

Prior to ProgressNow, Huttner was a founding partner in the Denver law firm of Foster, Graham and Huttner (now known as Foster Graham Milstein and Calisher, LLP) where he provided legal counsel on political, nonprofit and lobbying practice.  Prior to his private practice, Huttner worked as Policy Advisor to Governor Roy Romer and before returning to Colorado, his home, he clerked at the White House for the Office of the Counsel to the President.

Huttner grew up in Denver, Colorado and graduated from Cherry Creek High School, earned his B.A. from Brown University and his J.D. from the UC Hastings College of Law. He has taught as an adjunct professor at the University of Denver College of Law.

References

External links 
 huffingtonpost.com/michael-huttner
 progressnow.org

Living people
American male writers
Brown University alumni
University of California, Hastings College of the Law alumni
University of Denver faculty
1969 births